Burnage is an area and electoral ward of Manchester, England. Different parts of this ward are represented by different MPs following boundary changes in 2018; the majority of the ward is part of the Manchester Withington constituency but a portion is part of the Manchester Gorton constituency. The 2011 Census recorded a population of 15,227.

Councillors 
 three councillors serve the ward: Azra Ali (Lab), Ben Clay (Lab), and Bev Craig (Lab).

 indicates seat up for re-election.
 indicates seat won in by-election.

Elections in 2020s 
* denotes incumbent councillor seeking re-election.

May 2021

Elections in 2010s

May 2019

May 2018

May 2016

May 2015

May 2014

May 2012

May 2011

May 2010

Elections in 2000s

References 

Areas of Manchester
Manchester City Council Wards